Cadoxton is an electoral ward of Neath Port Talbot county borough, Wales.  It forms part of the parish of Blaenhonddan.

Cadoxton consists of some or all of the settlements of Cadoxton-juxta-Neath and Cilfrew in the parliamentary constituency of Neath.  The ward consists of a built up area and a strip of woodland to the south with areas of pasture in the central and northern areas.

Cadoxton is bounded by the wards of Rhos and Crynant to the north; Aberdulais and Tonna to the east; Neath North to the south; and Bryncoch South and Bryncoch North to the west.

Election results
In the 2012 local council elections, the electorate turnout was 35.67%.  The results were:

In the 2017 local council elections, the results were:

References

Electoral wards of Neath Port Talbot